Nitronate monooxygenase (NMO) is an enzyme with systematic name nitronate:oxygen 2-oxidoreductase (nitrite-forming). This enzyme catalyses the following chemical reaction

 ethylnitronate + O2  acetaldehyde + nitrite + other products

The enzymes from the fungus Neurospora crassa and the yeast Williopsis saturnus var. mrakii contain non-covalently bound FMN as the cofactor.

References

External links 
 

EC 1.13.12